Boulevard Chave is a major boulevard in Marseille, Bouches-du-Rhône, France.

Location
The Boulevard Chave is located in the 5th arrondissement of Marseille. It runs from the Place Jean-Jaurès all the way down to the Gare de Marseille-Blancarde.

It is bisected by Rue de Bruys, Rue Eugène Pierre, Rue du Progrès, Rue de l'Église Saint-Michel, Rue Goudard, Rue Escoffier, Rue Louis Astruc, Rue du Camas, Rue George (left) and Rue du Docteur Simone Sedan (right), Rue Madon, Boulevard Sakakini, Rue Berthe Simon, Rue de l’Éguier (left) and Rue Jean Martin (right), Rue Monier, Boulevard Boisson, Traverse de l'Équateur (left) and Rue Audibert (right), and Rue Yves Chapuis.

History and landmarks
The boulevard was named in honor of André Chave (1799–1868), a landowner and real estate developer.

Most buildings are three storeys high, with three widows. There are also Art Nouveau buildings.

French actor Fernandel (1903-1971) was born at 72 Boulevard Chave. A bust in his honor now stands outside the building.

On the corner of Boulevard Chave and Rue George, a prison was built in the 1850s. It was demolished in 1958 and later replaced with a primary school.

In 1892, the Compagnie du chemin de fer de l'Est-Marseille established a tramline along the boulevard. On the West side, they built an underground tram tunnel, going all the way Gare de Noailles.

The boulevard was mentioned by French novelist Émile Zola in Chapter 13 of his 1895 novel entitled Les Mystères de Marseille.

References

Streets in Marseille
5th arrondissement of Marseille